Umbriel may refer to:
 Umbriel (moon), a moon of Uranus
 Mount Umbriel, a mountain on Alexander Island, Antarctica
 Umbriel (Futurama), a character in "The Deep South" episode of Futurama
 Umbriel, a sprite in The Rape of the Lock by Alexander Pope
 Umbriel, a fictional location in The Infernal City by Greg Keyes

See also 
 Embryo, an early stage of development of a multicellular organism
 Umbra (disambiguation)